This is a list of awards and nominations received by American DJ and record producer DJ Khaled. Grammy Award-winner, DJ Khaled has earned numerous awards throughout his career, being mentioned in major international award ceremonies, winning 13 BET Hip Hop Awards, 2 BET Awards, one Soul Train Music Awards and both one MTV Video Music Awards and MTV Europe Music Awards. Awarded 1 iHeartRadio Music Awards along with the accomplishment of reaching 1 Billion Total Audience Spins for “Wild Thoughts” feat Rihanna & Bryson Tiller.

Awards and nominations

References

External links

Khaled, DJ